AM Tour was the fifth headlining concert tour by English indie rock band Arctic Monkeys, launched in support of their fifth studio album, AM (2013). The tour began on 22 May 2013 in Ventura, United States at Ventura Theatre and concluded on 15 November 2014 in Río de Janeiro, Brazil at HSBC Arena, visiting North America, South America, Oceania and Eurasia. This marked their first tour since Suck It and See Tour (2011–2012), and features the band, alongside touring members Scott Gillies, Tom Rowley, and Davey Latter.

Setlist

22 May 2013 – 1 June 2013
"Do I Wanna Know?"
"R U Mine?"
"Dancing Shoes"
"Brianstorm"
"Brick by Brick"
"Don't Sit Down 'Cause I've Moved Your Chair" 
"Evil Twin"  
"Old Yellow Bricks"
"The Hellcat Spangled Shalalala"
"Crying Lightning"
"Pretty Visitors"
"Do Me a Favour"
"Cornerstone"
"She's Thunderstorms"
"The View from the Afternoon"
"Fake Tales of San Francisco"
"I Bet You Look Good on the Dancefloor"
"That's Where You're Wrong"
Encore
"Suck It and See"
"Fluorescent Adolescent"
"505"

Notes
 On 24 May 2013, "The Hellcat Spangled Shalalala" and "That's Where You're Wrong" weren't performed.
 During the concerts on May 26 and 28, the band performed "That's Where You're Wrong" after "Old Yellow Bricks", ended the main set with "Suck It and See" and played "The Hellcat Spangled Shalalala" at the beginning of encore.
On May 29 and 31, the band changed the song order, starting the show with "Do I Wanna Know?", "Brianstorm", "Dancing Shoes", "Don't Sit Down 'Cause I've Moved Your Chair", "Brick by Brick", "Fake Tales of San Francisco" and "Evil Twin". Then, after "Cornerstone", Arctic Monkeys performed "Suck It and See", "The View from the Afternoon", "When the Sun Goes Down", "I Bet You Look Good on the Dancefloor" and "R U Mine?". "That's Where You're Wrong", "Fluorescent Adolescent" and "505" were played in encore.
On June 1, the band performed a set of thirteen songs: "Do I Wanna Know?", "Brianstorm", "Dancing Shoes", "Don't Sit Down 'Cause I've Moved Your Chair", "Brick by Brick", "Fake Tales of San Francisco", "Evil Twin", "The Hellcat Spangled Shalalala", "Crying Lightning", "Fluorescent Adolescent", "Suck It and See", "I Bet You Look Good on the Dancefloor" and "R U Mine?".

14 June 2013 – 18 July 2013
"Do I Wanna Know?"
"Brianstorm"
"Dancing Shoes"
"Don't Sit Down 'Cause I've Moved Your Chair"
"Teddy Picker"
"Crying Lightning"
"Brick by Brick"
"Fake Tales of San Francisco"
"She's Thunderstorms"
"Old Yellow Bricks"
"Pretty Visitors"
"I Bet You Look Good on the Dancefloor"
"Do Me a Favour"
"R U Mine?"
"Mad Sounds"
"Fluorescent Adolescent"
"A Certain Romance"
Encore
"Cornerstone"
"Mardy Bum"
"When the Sun Goes Down"
"505"

Notes
 During the concert on 14 June, the order was following: "Do I Wanna Know?", "Brianstorm", "Dancing Shoes", "Teddy Picker", "Don't Sit Down 'Cause I've Moved Your Chair", "Fake Tales of San Francisco", "The View from the Afternoon", "Old Yellow Bricks", "Suck It and See", "Crying Lightning", "Pretty Visitors", "Do Me a Favour", "Cornerstone", "She's Thunderstorms", "Mad Sounds", "R U Mine?", "I Bet You Look Good on the Dancefloor", "When the Sun Goes Down", "Fluorescent Adolescent" and "505".
 On 16 June 2013, Arctic Monkeys didn't perform "Brick by Brick", and played "The View from the Afternoon" instead of "She's Thunderstorms". "Don't Sit Down 'Cause I've Moved Your Chair" was performed after "Crying Lightning" and the set ended with "Do Me a Favour", "Cornerstone", "Suck It and See", "Mad Sounds", "R U Mine?" and "When the Sun Goes Down", with "Fluorescent Adolescent" and "505" in the encore.
 During the 21 June and 22 June concerts, "Fake Tales of San Francisco" wasn't performed. "She's Thunderstorms" was performed before "Brick by Brick".
On 23 June, "Fake Tales of San Francisco" wasn't performed.
During the concert at Subbotnik Festival in Russia on 6 July, after "Do Me a Favour" the band performed "Evil Twin", "Fluorescent Adolescent" and "R U Mine?" at the end of main set. "Mad Sounds" and "A Certain Romance" weren't performed.
During the concert at Rock in Roma on 10 July, the band performed "Evil Twin" after "Fake Tales of San Francisco". "Do Me a Favour", "Fluorescent Adolescent" and "R U Mine?" were performed at the end of main set. "505" was performed together with Miles Kane.
 During the concerts in Ferrara (11 July), Wiesen (13 July) and Carcassonne (15 July), Arctic Monkeys performed "Evil Twin" instead of "Fake Tales of San Francisco". "She's Thunderstorms" was played after "Old Yellow Bricks" and the main set ended with "Do Me a Favour", "Suck It and See", "Fluorescent Adolescent" and "R U Mine?".
 On 16 July and 18 July, the band performed "Evil Twin" instead of "Fake Tales of San Francisco". "She's Thunderstorms" was played after "Old Yellow Bricks" and the main set ended with "Do Me a Favour", "Cornerstone", "Suck It and See", "Fluorescent Adolescent", "R U Mine?" In the encore, Arctic Monkeys played "Mad Sounds", "When the Sun Goes Down" and "505".
 After the death of Lou Reed the band played a cover of 'Walk on the Wild Side' as their penultimate song during their concert at the Echo Arena in Liverpool on 28 October 2013

30 January 2014 –  15 February 2014
"Do I Wanna Know?"
"Brianstorm"
"Dancing Shoes"
"Evil Twin"
"Snap Out of It"
"Crying Lightning"
"Don't Sit Down 'Cause I've Moved Your Chair"
"Fireside"
"Reckless Serenade"
"Why'd You Only Call Me When You're High?"
"Arabella"
"Pretty Visitors"
"I Bet You Look Good on the Dancefloor"
"Suck It And See"
"Knee Socks"
"Fluorescent Adolescent"
"505"
Encore
"Cornerstone"
"One for the Road"
"R U Mine?"

Tour dates

Box office score data

 Part of the Sasquatch! Music Festival

 Part of the Free Press Summer Fest

 Part of the Hultsfred Festival

Tour members

Arctic Monkeys
 Alex Turner – lead vocals, guitar
 Jamie Cook – guitar
 Nick O'Malley – bass guitar, backing vocals
 Matt Helders – drums, percussion, backing vocals

Touring members
Thomas Rowley – guitar, keyboards, percussion, backing vocals
 Scott Gillies – guitar, keyboards
 Davey Latter – percussion

Guests
Bill Ryder-Jones – guitar on "Pretty Visitors", "Piledriver Waltz", "Arabella", "I Want It All", "Fireside", "Why'd You Only Call Me When You're High?", "Snap Out Of It", "I Wanna Be Yours", "Walk On The Wild Side", "All My Loving", keyboards on "No. 1 Party Anthem", backing vocals on "Walk On The Wild Side"
Miles Kane – guitar on "505"
Josh Homme – backing vocals on "Knee Socks"

References

2013 concert tours
Arctic Monkeys
2014 concert tours